Francis Lentz Hoover (November 15, 1914 – March 19, 2002) was an American college sports coach and administrator.  He coached American football, basketball, baseball, and tennis at Appalachian State Teachers College—now known as Appalachian State University—located in Boone, North Carolina.  Hoover was the eighth head football coach, serving for one season in 1945, and the seventh basketball coach, serving for 11 seasons between 1945 and 1957, at Appalachian State. He led the Appalachian State Mountaineers men's basketball to two North State Conference championships.  Hoover was the president of the National Association of Intercollegiate Athletics (NAIA) for the 1960–61 academic year.

Head coaching record

Football

Basketball

References

1914 births
2002 deaths
American sports executives and administrators
Appalachian State Mountaineers baseball coaches
Appalachian State Mountaineers football coaches
Appalachian State Mountaineers men's basketball coaches
Appalachian State University alumni
Appalachian State University faculty
Basketball coaches from North Carolina
College golf coaches in the United States
College tennis coaches in the United States
Indiana University alumni
People from Statesville, North Carolina
University of North Carolina alumni